Between the Covers is a BBC talk show hosted by Sara Cox in which guest stars talk about their favourite books, alongside other book picks as well.

Episodes

Series One (2020) 
Sara Cox talks to guest stars about their favourite books as well as a book of the week pick from 2020, and a book written by one of the guests. These books are:

Book of the Week Pick (From 2020)

 The Midnight Library by Matt Haig
 Love After Love by Ingrid Persaud
Fifty-Fifty by Steve Cavanagh
This Lovely City by Louise Hare
Small Pleasures by Clare Chambers
Love in Color: Mythical Tales from Around the World, Retold by Bolu Babalola
The Devil and the Dark Water by Stuart Turton

Book Written By a Guest

 Sex Power Money (2019) by Sara Pascoe
 The Thursday Murder Club (2020) by Richard Osman
Love and Other Thought Experiments (2020) by Sophie Ward
To Be a Gay Man (2020) by Will Young
Just Ignore Him (2020) by Alan Davies
The Corner Shop (2019) by Babita Sharma
Home Stretch (2020) by Graham Norton

Series Two (2021) 
Sara Cox talks to guest stars about their favourite books as well as a popular book from 2020, and a book recently published in 2021. These books are:

2020

 The Vanishing Half by Brit Bennett
 The Lying Life of Adults by Elena Ferrante
The Girl with the Louding Voice by Abi Daré
Agent Running in the Field by John le Carré
Hamnet by Maggie O’Farrell
Shuggie Bain by Douglas Stuart

2021

 The Fine Art of Invisible Detection by Robert Goddard
 Should We Fall Behind by Sharon Duggal
Sixteen Horses by Greg Buchanan
Another Life by Jodie Chapman
The Last House on Needless Street by Catriona Ward
The Frequency of Us by Keith Stuart

Series Three (2021) 
Sara Cox talks to guest stars about their favourite books as well as a new book from 2021 and a Booker Prize backlist gem. These books are:

2021
Sorrow And Bliss by Meg Mason
The Coward by Jarred McGinnis
Still Life by Sarah Winman
Ascension by Oliver Harris
Small Things Like These by Claire Keegan
Sankofa by Chibundu Onuzo

Booker Prize backlist gems
Good Behaviour (1981) by Molly Keane
The Bookshop (1978) by Penelope Fitzgerald
Exit West (2017) by Mohsin Hamid
The Garden of Evening Mists (2011) by Tan Twan Eng
Fingersmith (2002) by Sarah Waters
The Secret Scripture (2008) by Sebastian Barry

Series Four (2022) 
Sara Cox talks to guest stars about their favourite books as well as a new book from 2022 and a book from the Big Jubilee Read. These books are:

2022
People Person by Candice Carty-Williams
Two Storm Wood by Philip Gray
Lessons In Chemistry by Bonnie Garmus
Love Marriage by Monica Ali
Metronome by Tom Watson
Exactly What You Mean by Ben Hinshaw
The Dictator's Wife by Freya Berry

Big Jubilee Read
The English Patient (1992) by Michael Ondaatje
The Lonely Londoners (1956) by Sam Selvon
Arrow Of God (1964) by Chinua Achebe
The Handmaid's Tale (1985) by Margaret Atwood
The Secret River (2005) by Kate Grenville
The Night Tiger (2019) by Yangsze Choo
The Crow Eaters (1978) by Bapsi Sidhwa

Series Five (2022) 
Sara Cox talks to guest stars about their favourite books as well as a new book from 2022 and one from the Booker Prize back catalogue. These books are:

2022

The Perfect Golden Circle by Benjamin Myers
The Second Sight of Zachary Cloudesley by Sean Lusk
Sometimes People Die by Simon Stephenson
The Night Ship by Jess Kidd
Take My Hand by Dolen Perkins-Valdez
The Dance Tree by Kiran Millwood Hargrave
Booker Prize
Cloud Atlas (2004) by David Mitchell
Snap (2018) by Belinda Bauer
The Long Song (2010) by Andrea Levy
The Remains of the Day (1989) by Kazuo Ishiguro
Moon Tiger (1987) by Penelope Lively
Us (2014) by David Nicholls

Series Six (2023) 
Sara Cox talks to guest stars about their favourite books as well as a new book from 2023 and a  book set in Europe to celebrate Eurovision.

References 

BBC television talk shows